Miloš Pech (born 22 August 1927) is a Czechoslovak sprint canoeist who competed from the late 1940s to the mid-1950s. He won two medals at the ICF Canoe Sprint World Championships with a silver (K-1 10000 m: 1954) and a bronze (K-4 1000 m: 1948). Pech also competed in two Summer Olympics, earning his best finish of fifth in the K-2 1000 m event at London in 1948.

References

Miloš Pech's profile at Sports Reference.com

1927 births
Possibly living people
Canoeists at the 1948 Summer Olympics
Canoeists at the 1952 Summer Olympics
Czechoslovak male canoeists
Olympic canoeists of Czechoslovakia
ICF Canoe Sprint World Championships medalists in kayak